The 2013 LSU Tigers baseball team represents Louisiana State University in the NCAA Division I baseball season of 2013. The Tigers played their home games in the new Alex Box Stadium, which opened in 2009. On May 17, 2013, the playing field at Alex Box Stadium was designated Skip Bertman Field, in honor of the LSU coach with the most wins in the program's history. At the end of the game against Ole Miss, the program celebrated the best regular season record in its history with 48 wins.

The team is coached by Paul Mainieri who is in his seventh season at LSU. In the 2012 season, the Tigers failed to reach the College World Series; however, the Tigers did win the regular season and post season SEC championship. Overall, the Tigers finished 47–18, 19–11 in the SEC.

Pre-season

Key losses
Kevin Gausman (RHP) - 4th overall selection in 2012 MLB Draft
Austin Nola (SS) - 4-year starter; 5th round selection in 2012 MLB Draft
Tyler Hanover (INF) - 4-year starter; 11th round selection in 2012 MLB Draft

Key players returning
Ryan Eades (RHP) - 5–3 with a 3.83 ERA in 2012
Mason Katz (1B) - 13 Home Runs in 2012 (Lead SEC)
Aaron Nola (RHP) - 7–4 with a 3.61 ERA in 2012
Raph Rhymes (OF) - 2012 SEC POY; Lead NCAA with .431 BA

Personnel

Roster

2013 LSU Tigers Baseball Roster & Bios http://www.lsusports.net/SportSelect.dbml?&DB_OEM_ID=5200&SPID=2173&SPSID=27867

Coaching staff

2013 LSU Tigers Baseball Coaches & Bios http://www.lsusports.net/SportSelect.dbml?&DB_OEM_ID=5200&SPID=2173&SPSID=28707

Schedule/Results

*Rankings are based on the team's current ranking in the Baseball America poll the week LSU faced each opponent.

Ranking movements

LSU Tigers in the 2013 Major League Baseball Draft
The following members and future members (denoted by *) of the LSU Tigers baseball program were drafted in the 2013 MLB Draft.

References

LSU Tigers baseball seasons
Lsu
Southeastern Conference baseball champion seasons
College World Series seasons
2013 NCAA Division I baseball tournament participants
LSU